Splitsvilla 9, styled as Splitsvilla IX, was the ninth season of Indian reality show MTV Splitsvilla. Hosted by Rannvijay Singh and Sunny Leone, the show premiered on 11 June 2016. Shot in Puducherry, the season had fifteen celebrity boys and six girls with the theme "Where Women Rule". The boys were not given the power to dump any girl. Three princesses and two warriors joined as wild card entries. Martina was the first queen followed by Rajnandini and then Kavya. The season finale aired on 8 October 2016 and was won by Gurmeet Singh Rehal and Kavya Khurana.

Contestants

References

2016 Indian television seasons